Hampstead School is a large comprehensive school in the London Borough of Camden, England. The school building is one of the oldest in the borough. It has about 1,300 students between the ages of 11 and 19 attending the Lower School (Year 7 through to Year 11) and the Sixth Form College (Year 12 and Year 13).

History

The main building on Westbere Road was originally the site of Haberdashers' Aske's Hampstead School having relocated from its Hoxton premises in January 1903 and before moving again to its current location in Elstree to become Haberdashers' Aske's Boys' School. Hampstead School was founded as a secondary modern in 1961 and incorporated Harben Secondary Modern School in Netherwood Street, Kilburn, before becoming a comprehensive. The old school's Latin motto Is est emendo; tendo quod macula iocus notitia (to correct faults, give direction and impart knowledge) can still be seen on the face of the main building.

Academic standards
The school was awarded a 'gold star' accolade by Ofsted in 2001, which placed it within the top 6% of schools in the country. This was despite half of its 1,275 pupils speaking English as a second language and 10 per cent being refugees. Compared with similar schools, Hampstead was rated well above average for exam results and given an 'A' grade.

Some aspects of the school's performance according to Ofsted dipped after the 2005 inspection. In particular, attendance and GCSE results fell sharply in 2006. However, according to Ofsted this dip was corrected by 2008.

GCSE students sitting their examinations in 2010 achieved the school's highest Key Stage 4 results to date, surpassing the record set by the 2009 cohort.

The 2012 Ofsted report graded the school as 'good' for both achievement of pupils and quality of teaching.

Sixth Form
The school's approach means that students enter the sixth form with below average standards. Most go on to university when they leave.

The Hampstead Trash

In 2013 the head teacher reported to the police a student who had set up a website critical of the school.

Debating
The school's Debating Society meets every Friday and includes students from all year groups.

In 2005, 21 students from the school were the first team from a comprehensive school to win the cup for the Best Delegation at the Model United Nations (MUN) Forum held in Belfast. The conference was attended by around 250 delegates from over 20 schools in England, Canada, Burkina Faso, and America. The forum provides participants with the opportunity to debate issues of international concern. The students from Hampstead School also received several awards for outstanding individual performances.

In 2017 the school sent two teams to compete at the biennial MUN competition at Woodhouse College in Barnet. One of their teams, representing North Korea, won the award of Best Delegation at the conference.

Notable teachers
In the 1998 New Year's Honours List, Tamsyn Imison, then headteacher, was appointed a DBE. The citation stated that Imison had introduced initiatives to improve standards and ensured the best were spread to local schools.

Notable former pupils 

 Magdalen Berns, vlogger 
 Neil Brockdorff, Professor of Biochemistry at the University of Oxford
 Maya Jane Coles, musician
 Alex Bogdanovic, tennis player
 Pablo Bronstein, artist
 Doc Brown (Ben Bailey Smith), actor, rapper, brother of Zadie Smith
 Aslam Choudry, former Mayor of The London Borough of Brent
 Rowenna Davis, journalist
 Sadie Frost, actress
 Bruno Heller, TV producer (Gotham (TV series), Rome (TV series))
 Tobias Hill, novelist and poet
 Jasper Joffe, artist 
Adam Kidron, music producer
 Anita Klein, printmaker
 Deborah Levy, novelist, poet and playwright
 Andrew McIntosh, Baron McIntosh of Haringey, politician
 Zia Haider Rahman, author
 Justin Rowlatt, BBC presenter and reporter.
 Zadie Smith, novelist
 Mark Stein (footballer)
 Helen Storey, professor, artist and designer
 Aryan Tajbakhsh, footballer
 Amelia Toomey, Girli, singer, songwriter and rapper
 Jamie Waylett, Vincent Crabbe in the Harry Potter films
 Rachel Yankey, Arsenal, Notts County and England football player.

References

External links

 Hampstead School official website
 The Hampstead Trash - Critical blog opposed by the school administration

Secondary schools in the London Borough of Camden
Educational institutions established in 1862
1862 establishments in England
Schools in Hampstead
Community schools in the London Borough of Camden